The British office of high commissioner for Southern Africa was responsible for governing British possessions in Southern Africa, latterly the protectorates of Basutoland (now Lesotho), the Bechuanaland Protectorate (now Botswana) and Swaziland (now Eswatini), as well as for relations with autonomous governments in the area.

The office was combined with that of Governor of Cape Colony from 1847 to 1901, with that of the governor of Transvaal Colony 1901 to 1910, and with that of Governor-General of South Africa from 1910 to 1931. The British government appointed the Governor-General as High Commissioner under a separate commission. In addition to responsibility for Basutoland, Bechuanaland and Swaziland, he held reserve powers concerning the interests of the native population of Southern Rhodesia. The post was abolished on 1 August 1964.

List of officeholders

The high commission territories

The high commissioner was responsible for governing the following territories, in each case represented by a resident commissioner:

Basutoland, gained independence as Lesotho on 4 October 1966 
Bechuanaland, gained independence as Botswana on 30 September 1966
Swaziland, gained independence on 6 September 1968 (now Eswatini)

See also
List of high commissioners of the United Kingdom to South Africa
 Governor of Hong Kong - post held by two High Commissioners for Southern Africa

References

Further reading
 Spence, John Edward. "British policy towards the High Commission territories." Journal of modern African studies 2.2 (1964): 221-246.
 Torrance, David E. "Britain, South Africa, and the high commission territories: an old controversy revisited." Historical Journal 41.3 (1998): 751-772. online

.Southern Africa
History of South Africa
High commissioner
High commissioner
High commissioner
High commissioner
Governance of the British Empire
Southern Africa
Lists of office-holders
Lists of South African people
1847 establishments in Africa
1847 establishments in the British Empire